A phototool is a printed film used in the process of manufacturing a printed circuit board (PCB). The phototool is used as a mask to expose a photoresist material. The main alternative to using phototools is maskless lithography, more commonly referred to as direct imaging.

Traditionally, phototools were made with silver halide film or diazo film, but in recent years, many suppliers have come out with films that do not fit into either of these categories. All dry-film phototools are printed using a similar process to film photograph. 

The steps for using a phototool are as follows:

 A PCB (typically consisting of a laminate material with copper adhered to the surface) is prepared and cleaned.
 The PCB is coated with a photoresist material that can be cured with UV light
 The phototool is positioned over the PCB
 UV light (or other actinic radiation) shines through the phototool, selectively curing the material.
 The uncured material is washed away, usually using a mild water-based alkali solution.
 PCB can continue to a photolithography step such as surface plating, or a photoengraving step such as etching away unwanted material.

References and further reading
 Chemistry of Photography By: Dr. Drew Myers, Chemistry Coordinator
 Mees, C.E.K, and James, T.H., The Theory of the Photographic Process, 3rd ed., The Macmillan Co., New York, 1966.

Electronics manufacturing